Ignore Grief is the thirteenth studio album by American experimental band Xiu Xiu, released on March 3, 2023 by Polyvinyl. It was written by band frontman Jamie Stewart and new member David Kendrick. It was produced by fellow member Angela Seo, and recorded by Stewart at his home studio in Los Angeles, alongside a wide array of guest musicians including Charlie Looker, Ben Chisholm, Ezra Buchla, Patrick Shiroishi and Ian Wellman. The album artwork was designed by Janelle Abad, and depicts a white bat over a black background.

Ignore Grief is a departure from the band's previous album, more in line with the sounds and themes seen in Girl with Basket of Fruit (2019). It mainly features a sound that embodies experimental, industrial, and modern classical music. Instrumentally, it incorporates orchestral instrumentation including violins, violas, cellos, double bass, flutes and piano, in addition to the electronic percussion and synthesizers typically used by the band, as well as a variety of other instruments, including, gongs, double reed flute and found objects. Its lyrical content explores life's horrors and human tragedy, dealing with prostitution, sex trafficking, murder, cults and substance abuse, through two halves, one inspired by real stories, and the other one by imaginary ones, sang each by Seo and Stewart.

Its lead single, "Maybae Baeby" was released on January 12, 2023.

Background 
Ignore Grief was announced on January 12, 2023, via the band's social media platforms. Regarding the lead single, frontrunner Jamie Stewart said: “In 'Maybae Baeby,' the singer's viewpoint is of a young person hiding in a fantastical conversation with a tarantula in order to escape a physically abusive parent". The album also marks the first project to feature contributions from new member David Kendrick.

Composition

Musical style and influences
Ignore Grief is a bit of a departure from the band's previous album, more in line with the sounds and themes seen in Girl with Basket of Fruit (2019). It has been described by the band as an experimental, industrial, and modern classical music album.

Lyrics and themes
Ignore Grief is a two-part album with one half depicting the suffering of five people connected to the band, and the other depicting imaginary stories. Lyrically, the album deals with said suffering, and  acts as an "abstract exploration of the early rock and roll 'Teen Tragedy' genre", through themes such as  prostitution, sex trafficking, murder, cults and substance abuse. The imaginary songs are written as a way to offer levity to the band, due to the heaviness of the themes discussed. With the "aesthetic examination" of these issues, the band aspires "to see if there is any way to come out the other side or if there is even any reason. In either case there may not be but to simply turn away would be yet a further act of destruction".

Track listing

Personnel
Credits adapted from Polyvinyl.

Xiu Xiu
 Jamie Stewart – vocals, synthesizers, harmonium, percussion, electronic percussion, double reed flute, found objects, recording, arrangement
 Angela Seo – vocals, piano, gongs, no-input mixer, percussion, production
 David Kendrick – percussion, drums

Additional musicians

Charlie Looker – choral vocals
Ben Chisholm – synthesizer, piano, electronic percussion 
Ezra Buchla – viola
Patrick Shiroishi – saxophones
Ian Wellman – field recordings
Andrea Kopecká – violins
Radka Navrátilová – violins
Katrina Musilová – violas
Marie Vlčková – violas
Martina Čermáková – cellos
Jiřina Hájková – cellos
Pavel Kučera – double bass
Jitka Kašparová – flutes
Marika Nováková – flutes
Dominika Charvátová – woodwinds
Sára Štěpánová – woodwinds
Pavlína Vlková – woodwinds
Chris Dostál – brass
Katrina Lišková – brass
David Zelenka – brass

Technical
Lawrence English – mixing
Alan Douches – mastering

Artwork
 Janelle Abad – design

References 

2023 albums
Xiu Xiu albums
Polyvinyl Record Co. albums